William MacKendree is an American artist. He was born in Augusta, Georgia in 1948. He studied Philosophy and Visual Arts at Georgia State University in Atlanta. Following the completion of his university degrees, he left the U.S. to live and work in Greece between 1975 and 1982.

Biography
His time in Greece was shared between Thessaloniki and the island of Paros. There were many trips of discovery throughout Greece and the Balkan Peninsula, as well as Turkey, North Africa, and the Mediterranean world. The encounters with Archaic Greek sculpture and Minoan Painting left deep impressions, above all for their provocative simplicity and essence of line. The potential for the figurative within the context of the dominant minimalist visual culture of contemporary art may well have germinated from the initial visual shocks of this imagery. Here was an art that embodied  both graphic dynamism and the impulse to vital forms and themes. His six years in Greece provided a relatively isolated cocoon for research and experimental trial-and-error ; moving steadily closer to a way to flesh out his first personal, near-archaic, works.

It was soon after his arrival in Paris that he made the group of paintings that constituted his first gallery exhibition, in 1984. In the aftermath there appeared articles on these works in art magazines such as ‘Eighty’, Opus International, Flash Art, and Art in America. He was invited to participate in the international survey of contemporary art ‘Anniottanta’ at the Museum of Modern art of Bologna in 1985. That same year, he received the Prix de Peinture at the Salon International d’Art Contemporain in Montrouge, and his work was acquired by the Musée Nationale d’Art Moderne et Contemporaine, the Centre Pompidou, in Paris.

Exhibitions in Vienna, Innsbruck, and Rome were held in 1986, and he also began a long-running collaboration with Michael Woolworth publications, creating numerous prints and artist’s books in the intervening years. Other collaborations and commissions have subsequently become an integral facet of his visual production. Mural projects were realized for the Reims Urban Transport headquarters (1998), for the City of Paris (2000), La Grande Arche de la Défense (1991), as well as for private companies in France.

The Centre Regional d’Art Contemporain of Toulouse presented the first large institutional survey of his work in 1990. Since then there have followed regular intervals of exhibitions in galleries throughout Europe.

Exhibitions
Solo exhibitions
2012
Galerie Vidal-Saint Phalle, Paris
Galerie Storrer, Zurich
Galerie La Navire, Brest

2011
Galerie Placido, Paris

2009
Galerie La Navire, Brest

2007
Galerie Erich Storrer, Zurich

2005
Galerie La Navire, Brest
Le Quartz, Brest

2004
Galerie Vidal-St.Phalle, Paris
Galerie La Navire, Brest

2002
Art Koln, Galerie Vidal-St. Phalle, Paris

2001
Galerie Vidal-St. Phalle, Paris

2000
Galerie Nanky De Vreeze, Amsterdam
F.I.A.C., Michael Woolworth Publications

Group exhibitions
2012
'Ressources Humaines', Les Abattoirs, Musée d'Art Contemporain, Toulouse
'Louyétu', Maison des Arts, Centre d'Art Contemporain, Carjac

2011
‘Drawing Now’, Salon du Dessin Contemporain ; Carrousel du Louvre, Paris
Galeries Vidal-St. Phalle, La Navire, Placido
‘Woolworth Publications’, Nomad Gallery, Brussels

2010
‘Vingt Ans Apres’, Galerie Vidal-St. Phalle, Paris 
‘Art en Edition’, l’Espace Topographie de l’Art, Paris

2009
‘Que du Papier’, Galerie Placido, Paris

2007
‘Sweet Powder’, Aître Saint Maclou, Ecole Regionale des Beaux Arts, Rouen

2006
‘Quinze Ans, Quinze Artistes’, Galerie Vidal-St. Phalle, Paris

2005
‘Print it, Damn it’, Museo del Grabado, Fuendetodos

2003
‘Jazz’,  Université de Brest, Brest

2001
’10 Ans Aprês’, Galerie Vidal-St.-Phalle, Paris

1999
‘Jeux de Genres’, Espace Electra, Paris

Public collections
La Grande Arche de la Défense, Paris
Fonds National d’Art Contemporain, Ministère de la Culture, France
La Ville de Paris
Neue Galerie der Stadt, Linz
Musée d’Art Moderne et Contemporain, Toulouse
Musée National d’Art Moderne, Paris
Transports Urbain de Reims
Leepa-Rattner Museum of Art, Tarpon Springs, Florida

Public commissions

2006–2008
Mural Installations, Verlingue Courtiers en Assurance, Quimper

2000 
Wall Mural, City of Paris, rue des Dames

1998
Mural Installation, Transport Urbain de Reims Headquarters

Awards and grants

Prix de Peinture, Salon International de Montrouge, 1985
Pollock-Krasner Foundation, New York, 1996

References

Publications

'William MacKendree/Vinyl Vocabulary', published by Hirmer Verlag, Munich, 2012; texts by Alain Mousseigne, Laurie Hurwitz, 156 pages, 100 color reproductions

Press articles
'William MacKendree ou l'Espace de Transition', Giovanni Joppolo; Eighty Magazine No. 6, January/February 1985
'Les Signes Secrets de William MacKendree', Henri-Francois Debailleux; Café Crème Magazine No. 6, Hiver 1986
'La Part Irréductible', Robert Hoang Haî; Kanal Magazine No. 33-34, Octobre/Novembre 1987
'William MacKendree', Jean-Luc Chalumeau; Opus International, Automne 1987
'L'Objet Ex-Situ', Laurence Cabidoche; le Journal de Toulouse, 22/11/1990
'MacKendree se sent tou choses', Henri-Francois Debailleux; Liberation journal, 24/11/1990
'Het dromendagboek van kunschilder MacKendree, Max Borka; De Morgen journal, Brussels, 27/02/1991
'Mythologies de l'Enfance', Philippe Carteron; le Nouvel Observateur No. 1387, 06/06/1991
'La Guerre de Sécession de William MacKendree', Emmanuel Daydé; Muséart magazine, Octobre 1998

Catalog texts
Demosthènes Davvetas, 'Les Trois Actes D'Un Drame Pictural'; Text of exhibition catalog 'William MacKendree', Centre Régional d'Art Contemporain Midi-Pyrénées; Toulouse, France; 1990
Anne Tronche, 'Voir est un Acte', Text of exhibition catalog 'William MacKendree'; Centre d'Arts Plastiques de Saint-Fons, France; 1993
Laurent Boudier, 'Pas de Retour sur le Passé'; Text of exhibition catalogue 'MacKendree', Galeries Vidal St.-Phalle, Jacqueline Storme, La Navire; 1998

External links
official site
http://www.michaelwoolworth.com
http://www.lanavire.com/
http://www.galerie-placido.com/
http://www.galeriestorrer.com/galerie_erich_storrer_storrer_gallery_zurich/Galerie_Erich_Storrer.html
http://www.vidal-stphalle.com/

1948 births
20th-century American painters
American male painters
21st-century American painters
21st-century American male artists
Artists from Georgia (U.S. state)
People from Augusta, Georgia
Georgia State University alumni
Living people
20th-century American male artists